The Nepisiguit (Grand) Falls generating station is a hydroelectric dam built in the Canadian province of New Brunswick and is operated by NB Power corporation. It was purchased by the NB Electric Power Commission in the early 1950s from the Bathurst Power and Paper Company.

History

The hydroelectric power dam was constructed in a year and a half by 400 men. Its turbines were installed by 1926, the year of its commission to service.

It was first projected when the Great Falls Water Power and Boom Co. acquired the interests in the north-east bank of the river from the Dominion of Canada.  In 1905, a rival power company, the Grand Falls Power Co. acquired the interests on the south-west bank from the province of New Brunswick.

Its power house has as of 2016 a capacity of 11 megawatts from its three turbines. It is located in Bathurst Parish, Gloucester County.

References

Bibliography

External links

NB Power Corporation

Buildings and structures in Gloucester County, New Brunswick
NB Power
Dams in New Brunswick
Hydroelectric power stations in New Brunswick